Jean-François Joseph "J.F." Jomphe (born December 28, 1972) is a Canadian retired professional ice hockey player. He played in the National Hockey League with the Mighty Ducks of Anaheim, Phoenix Coyotes, and Montreal Canadiens between 1995 and 1999. The rest of his career, which lasted from 1993 to 2005, was spent in various minor leagues and in Europe. Internationally Jomphe played for the Canadian national team at both the 1995 and 1996 World Championships, winning a bronze medal in 1995.

Biography
As a youth, he played in the 1986 Quebec International Pee-Wee Hockey Tournament with a minor ice hockey team from Rosemère, Quebec.

Jomphe played 111 regular season games in the National Hockey League for the Mighty Ducks of Anaheim, Phoenix Coyotes and the Montreal Canadiens. He scored 10 goals and 29 assists for 39 points, collecting 102 penalty minutes.  In 1999, Jomphe moved to Europe and played in Germany (Krefeld Pinguine, Adler Mannheim) and Switzerland before retiring in 2005. Jomphe has coached the LA Selects Hockey team.

Jomphe was married to his first wife Jaci Smith, heir to the Smith's grocery store chain. Jomphe married his second wife, Shay Lynn Gatlin, on May 12, 2006 at the St. Regis hotel in Monarch Beach, California, after meeting in 2000. In 2007 their only son, Presley Joseph Jomphe, was born. Jomphe & Shay divorced in 2010.

Career statistics

Regular season and playoffs

International

References

External links
 

1972 births
Adler Mannheim players
Baltimore Bandits players
Canadian ice hockey centres
Cincinnati Mighty Ducks players
EHC Biel players
ERC Ingolstadt players
Fredericton Canadiens players
French Quebecers
Greensboro Monarchs players
Ice hockey people from Quebec
Krefeld Pinguine players
Las Vegas Thunder players
Living people
Mighty Ducks of Anaheim players
Montreal Canadiens players
People from Côte-Nord
Phoenix Coyotes players
Quebec Rafales players
San Diego Gulls (IHL) players
Shawinigan Cataractes players
Sherbrooke Faucons players
Springfield Falcons players
Undrafted National Hockey League players